David B. Chyzowski (born July 11, 1971) is a Canadian former professional ice hockey left winger. He was selected second overall in the 1989 NHL Entry Draft by the New York Islanders after playing major junior with the Kamloops Blazers. He spent parts of six seasons in the National Hockey League with the Islanders and Chicago Blackhawks between 1989 and 1997, with the rest of his career spent in various minor leagues and in Europe.

Playing career
Chyzowski is generally recognized as a draft bust as he only played 126 NHL games between 1989 and 1995, scoring 31 points. He was chosen ahead of fellow first-round picks Bill Guerin, Stu Barnes, and Bobby Holik. Chyzowski spent his career with the Islanders and Chicago Blackhawks. While Chyzowski did not have an impact at the NHL level, he did carve out a nice career in the minor leagues, particularly the AHL and IHL. His best minor league season was 1995–96, when he had 83 points on 44 goals and 39 assists, along with 160 penalty minutes, for Adirondack Red Wings.

In 2006, he was playing for Linz EHC in the Austrian League. After his playing career, he took on the position of Marketing Coordinator for the Kamloops Blazers Hockey Club.

Career statistics

Regular season and playoffs

International

Awards
 WHL West First All-Star Team – 1989

References

External links 

1971 births
Living people
Adirondack Red Wings players
Augsburger Panther players
Canadian ice hockey left wingers
Capital District Islanders players
Chicago Blackhawks players
EHC Black Wings Linz players
Graz 99ers players
Ice hockey people from Edmonton
Indianapolis Ice players
Kamloops Blazers players
Kalamazoo Wings (1974–2000) players
Kansas City Blades players
München Barons players
National Hockey League first-round draft picks
New York Islanders draft picks
New York Islanders players
Orlando Solar Bears (IHL) players
St. Albert Saints players
Salt Lake Golden Eagles (IHL) players
San Antonio Dragons players
Schwenninger Wild Wings players
Springfield Indians players
Vienna Capitals players
Canadian expatriate ice hockey players in Austria
Canadian expatriate ice hockey players in Germany
Canadian expatriate ice hockey players in the United States